In differential geometry there are a number of second-order, linear, elliptic differential operators bearing the name Laplacian.  This article provides an overview of some of them.

Connection Laplacian 
The connection Laplacian, also known as the rough Laplacian, is a differential operator acting on the various tensor bundles of a manifold, defined in terms of a Riemannian- or pseudo-Riemannian metric.  When applied to functions (i.e. tensors of rank 0), the connection
Laplacian is often called the Laplace–Beltrami operator.  It is defined as the trace of the second covariant derivative:

where T is any tensor,  is the Levi-Civita connection associated to the metric, and the trace is taken with respect to
the metric.  Recall that the second covariant derivative of T is defined as

Note that with this definition, the connection Laplacian has negative spectrum.  On functions, it agrees with
the operator given as the divergence of the gradient.

If the connection of interest is the Levi-Civita connection one can find a convenient formula for the Laplacian of a scalar function in terms of partial derivatives with respect to a coordinate system:

where  is a scalar function,  is absolute value of the determinant of the metric (absolute value is necessary in the pseudo-Riemannian case, e.g. in General Relativity) and  denotes the inverse of the metric tensor.

Hodge Laplacian 
The Hodge Laplacian, also known as the Laplace–de Rham operator, is a differential operator acting on differential forms.  (Abstractly,
it is a second order operator on each exterior power of the cotangent bundle.)  This operator is defined on any manifold equipped with
a Riemannian- or pseudo-Riemannian metric.

where d is the exterior derivative or differential and δ is the codifferential.  The Hodge Laplacian on a compact manifold has nonnegative spectrum.

The connection Laplacian may also be taken to act on differential forms by restricting it to act on skew-symmetric tensors.  The connection Laplacian differs from the Hodge Laplacian by means of a Weitzenböck identity.

Bochner Laplacian 
The Bochner Laplacian is defined differently from the connection Laplacian, but the two will turn out to differ only by a sign, whenever the former is defined.  Let M be a compact, oriented manifold equipped with a metric.  Let E be a vector bundle over M equipped with a fiber metric and a compatible connection, .  This connection gives rise to a differential operator

The Bochner Laplacian is given by

which is a second order operator acting on sections of the vector bundle E.  Note that the connection Laplacian and Bochner Laplacian differ only by a sign:

Lichnerowicz Laplacian 
The Lichnerowicz Laplacian is defined on symmetric tensors by taking  to be the symmetrized covariant derivative. The Lichnerowicz Laplacian differs from the usual tensor Laplacian by a Weitzenbock formula involving the Riemann curvature tensor, and has natural applications in the study of Ricci flow and the prescribed Ricci curvature problem.

Conformal Laplacian 
On a Riemannian manifold, one can define the conformal Laplacian as an operator on smooth functions; it differs from the Laplace–Beltrami operator by a term involving the scalar curvature of the underlying metric.  In dimension n ≥ 3, the conformal Laplacian, denoted L, acts on a smooth function u by

where Δ is the Laplace-Beltrami operator (of negative spectrum), and R is the scalar curvature.  This operator often makes an appearance when studying how the scalar curvature behaves under a conformal change of a Riemannian metric.  If n ≥ 3 and g is a metric and u is a smooth, positive function, then the conformal metric

has scalar curvature given by

More generally, the action of the conformal Laplacian of g̃ on smooth functions φ can be related to that of the conformal Laplacian of g via the transformation rule

Comparisons 
Below is a table summarizing the various Laplacian operators, including the most general vector bundle on which they act, and what structure is required for the manifold and vector bundle.  All of these operators are second order, linear, and elliptic.

See also 
Weitzenböck identity

References 

Differential operators
Differential geometry